Borrego (Spanish: "lamb") may refer to:

People

Surname
Carla Borrego (b. 1983), Jamaican-Australian international basketball and netball player
Diego Borrego (b. 1972), Spanish golfer
Elías Borrego (b. 1990),  Argentine footballer
Francisco José Borrego (b. 1986), Spanish footballer
James Borrego (b. 1977), American basketball coach
Jesse Borrego (b. 1962),  American actor
Manuel Borrego (b. 1934), Portuguese fencer
Orlando Borrego (b. 1936), Cuban economist

Nickname
Gerardo Torrado (b. 1979), Mexican footballer. Known as "El borrego" ("The Sheep") for his bushy hair.

In fiction
Carla Borrego, a fictional character in British television series Jonathan Creek

Sport
Borrego (horse)
Borregos Salvajes (in English: Rams) the name of all the sports teams that represent the Monterrey Institute of Technology
Borregos Salvajes – CEM Monterrey, Campus
Los Angeles Rams NFL Football Team

Entertainment
 Borrego (film), a survival-thriller film
 "El Borrego" ("The Sheep"), 1994 song originally from Café Tacuba's album Re

Places
Borrego Pass, New Mexico unincorporated community consisting of two Navajo communities and a trading post
Borrego Valley Airport county-owned public airport three miles east of Borrego Springs
Anza-Borrego Desert State Park (ABDSP) state park located within the Colorado Desert of southern California
Borrego Springs, California surrounded by Anza-Borrego State Park, the largest of California's State Parks
Borrego Springs Fire Protection District

See also
Kia Mohave variant Kia Borrego, named after the Anza-Borrego Desert State Park in California